The 2003–04 New York Rangers season was the franchise's 78th season. The team finished with one of the worst records in the league and missed the Stanley Cup playoffs for the seventh consecutive season despite bringing in future Hall of Famer Jaromir Jagr midway through the season. The team would eventually trade away most of its major acquisitions, including their long-time defensive stalwart Brian Leetch. This would prove to be the final season for team captain Mark Messier.

Off-season
On July 1, 2003, general manager Glen Sather announced he would remain the Rangers head coach.

Regular season
Glen Sather stepped down as head coach on February 24, 2004, to focus on his managerial duties. Assistant coach Tom Renney was named interim head coach. Sather would make nine trades between then and the March 9 trading deadline, shipping out several veteran players for draft picks and prospects.

Final standings

Schedule and results

|- align="center" bgcolor="#FFBBBB"
| 1 || October 10 || @ Minnesota Wild || 5 – 3 || 0–1–0–0 || 
|- align="center" bgcolor="#FFBBBB"
| 2 || October 11 || @ Columbus Blue Jackets || 5 – 0 || 0–2–0–0 || 
|- align="center" bgcolor="white"
| 3 || October 16 || Atlanta Thrashers || 0 – 0 OT || 0–2–1–0 || 
|- align="center" bgcolor="white"
| 4 || October 18 || Carolina Hurricanes || 2 – 2 OT || 0–2–2–0 || 
|- align="center" bgcolor="#CCFFCC"
| 5 || October 20 || Florida Panthers || 3 – 1 || 1–2–2–0 || 
|- align="center" bgcolor="#CCFFCC"
| 6 || October 25 || Detroit Red Wings || 3 – 1 || 2–2–2–0 || 
|- align="center" bgcolor="#FFBBBB"
| 7 || October 28 || Mighty Ducks of Anaheim || 3 – 1 || 2–3–2–0 || 
|- align="center" bgcolor="#CCFFCC"
| 8 || October 30 || Carolina Hurricanes || 4 – 1 || 3–3–2–0 || 
|-

|- align="center" bgcolor="#CCFFCC"
| 9 || November 1 || @ Montreal Canadiens || 5 – 1 || 4–3–2–0 || 
|- align="center" bgcolor="#FF6F6F"
| 10 || November 2 || Colorado Avalanche || 3 – 2 OT || 4–3–2–1 || 
|- align="center" bgcolor="#CCFFCC"
| 11 || November 4 || Dallas Stars || 3 – 0 || 5–3–2–1 || 
|- align="center" bgcolor="#FFBBBB"
| 12 || November 6 || @ Carolina Hurricanes || 6 – 3 || 5–4–2–1 || 
|- align="center" bgcolor="#FF6F6F"
| 13 || November 8 || Philadelphia Flyers || 2 – 1 OT || 5–4–2–2 || 
|- align="center" bgcolor="#FFBBBB"
| 14 || November 10 || Edmonton Oilers || 5 – 4 || 5–5–2–2 || 
|- align="center" bgcolor="#CCFFCC"
| 15 || November 12 || Pittsburgh Penguins || 6 – 2 || 6–5–2–2 || 
|- align="center" bgcolor="#FFBBBB"
| 16 || November 15 || @ New Jersey Devils || 5 – 0 || 6–6–2–2 || 
|- align="center" bgcolor="white"
| 17 || November 16 || @ Chicago Blackhawks || 2 – 2 OT || 6–6–3–2 || 
|- align="center" bgcolor="white"
| 18 || November 18 || @ San Jose Sharks || 2 – 2 OT || 6–6–4–2 || 
|- align="center" bgcolor="#FFBBBB"
| 19 || November 20 || @ Colorado Avalanche || 4 – 3 || 6–7–4–2 || 
|- align="center" bgcolor="#CCFFCC"
| 20 || November 23 || Ottawa Senators || 6 – 2 || 7–7–4–2 || 
|- align="center" bgcolor="#CCFFCC"
| 21 || November 25 || @ Tampa Bay Lightning || 2 – 0 || 8–7–4–2 || 
|- align="center" bgcolor="white"
| 22 || November 26 || @ Florida Panthers || 3 – 3 OT || 8–7–5–2 || 
|- align="center" bgcolor="#CCFFCC"
| 23 || November 28 || @ Pittsburgh Penguins || 4 – 1 || 9–7–5–2 || 
|- align="center" bgcolor="#FFBBBB"
| 24 || November 30 || Toronto Maple Leafs || 4 – 2 || 9–8–5–2 || 
|-

|- align="center" bgcolor="#FFBBBB"
| 25 || December 2 || @ Toronto Maple Leafs || 5 – 4 || 9–9–5–2 || 
|- align="center" bgcolor="#CCFFCC"
| 26 || December 4 || @ New York Islanders || 4 – 2 || 10–9–5–2 || 
|- align="center" bgcolor="#FFBBBB"
| 27 || December 7 || Tampa Bay Lightning || 3 – 2 || 10–10–5–2 || 
|- align="center" bgcolor="#FFBBBB"
| 28 || December 10 || Montreal Canadiens || 2 – 1 || 10–11–5–2 || 
|- align="center" bgcolor="#CCFFCC"
| 29 || December 12 || @ Buffalo Sabres || 3 – 1 || 11–11–5–2 || 
|- align="center" bgcolor="#FFBBBB"
| 30 || December 13 || @ Toronto Maple Leafs || 3 – 1 || 11–12–5–2 || 
|- align="center" bgcolor="#CCFFCC"
| 31 || December 18 || New York Islanders || 4 – 3 || 12–12–5–2 || 
|- align="center" bgcolor="#FFBBBB"
| 32 || December 20 || @ Ottawa Senators || 3 – 1 || 12–13–5–2 || 
|- align="center" bgcolor="#CCFFCC"
| 33 || December 22 || Boston Bruins || 4 – 2 || 13–13–5–2 || 
|- align="center" bgcolor="#FF6F6F"
| 34 || December 26 || Toronto Maple Leafs || 6 – 5 OT || 13–13–5–3 || 
|- align="center" bgcolor="#CCFFCC"
| 35 || December 29 || @ Phoenix Coyotes || 3 – 2 OT || 14–13–5–3 || 
|- align="center" bgcolor="#CCFFCC"
| 36 || December 30 || @ Los Angeles Kings || 3 – 2 OT || 15–13–5–3 || 
|-

|- align="center" bgcolor="#FFBBBB"
| 37 || January 1 || @ St. Louis Blues || 5 – 4 || 15–14–5–3 || 
|- align="center" bgcolor="#CCFFCC"
| 38 || January 3 || @ Pittsburgh Penguins || 4 – 1 || 16–14–5–3 || 
|- align="center" bgcolor="#FFBBBB"
| 39 || January 5 || Calgary Flames || 5 – 0 || 16–15–5–3 || 
|- align="center" bgcolor="#FFBBBB"
| 40 || January 8 || @ Carolina Hurricanes || 3 – 2 || 16–16–5–3 || 
|- align="center" bgcolor="#CCFFCC"
| 41 || January 10 || @ New York Islanders || 3 – 2 || 17–16–5–3 || 
|- align="center" bgcolor="#FF6F6F"
| 42 || January 11 || Tampa Bay Lightning || 2 – 1 OT || 17–16–5–4 || 
|- align="center" bgcolor="#CCFFCC"
| 43 || January 13 || New York Islanders || 4 – 1 || 18–16–5–4 || 
|- align="center" bgcolor="white"
| 44 || January 15 || New Jersey Devils || 3 – 3 OT || 18–16–6–4 || 
|- align="center" bgcolor="white"
| 45 || January 17 || @ Montreal Canadiens || 2 – 2 OT || 18–16–7–4 || 
|- align="center" bgcolor="#FFBBBB"
| 46 || January 19 || @ Boston Bruins || 5 – 2 || 18–17–7–4 || 
|- align="center" bgcolor="#FFBBBB"
| 47 || January 20 || Boston Bruins || 4 – 1 || 18–18–7–4 || 
|- align="center" bgcolor="#FFBBBB"
| 48 || January 22 || Philadelphia Flyers || 4 – 2 || 18–19–7–4 || 
|- align="center" bgcolor="#FFBBBB"
| 49 || January 24 || @ Ottawa Senators || 9 – 1 || 18–20–7–4 || 
|- align="center" bgcolor="#CCFFCC"
| 50 || January 26 || Florida Panthers || 5 – 2 || 19–20–7–4 || 
|- align="center" bgcolor="#FFBBBB"
| 51 || January 28 || Washington Capitals || 2 – 1 || 19–21–7–4 || 
|- align="center" bgcolor="#FFBBBB"
| 52 || January 30 || Buffalo Sabres || 3 – 1 || 19–22–7–4 || 
|- align="center" bgcolor="#FFBBBB"
| 53 || January 31 || @ Buffalo Sabres || 3 – 1 || 19–23–7–4 || 
|-

|- align="center" bgcolor="#CCFFCC"
| 54 || February 2 || Vancouver Canucks || 4 – 3 || 20–23–7–4 || 
|- align="center" bgcolor="#FFBBBB"
| 55 || February 4 || Minnesota Wild || 4 – 3 || 20–24–7–4 || 
|- align="center" bgcolor="#CCFFCC"
| 56 || February 11 || @ New Jersey Devils || 3 – 1 || 21–24–7–4 || 
|- align="center" bgcolor="#FFBBBB"
| 57 || February 12 || Philadelphia Flyers || 2 – 1 || 21–25–7–4 || 
|- align="center" bgcolor="#FFBBBB"
| 58 || February 14 || @ Philadelphia Flyers || 6 – 2 || 21–26–7–4 || 
|- align="center" bgcolor="#FFBBBB"
| 59 || February 16 || Ottawa Senators || 4 – 1 || 21–27–7–4 || 
|- align="center" bgcolor="#CCFFCC"
| 60 || February 19 || New York Islanders || 6 – 2 || 22–27–7–4 || 
|- align="center" bgcolor="#FFBBBB"
| 61 || February 21 || New Jersey Devils || 7 – 3 || 22–28–7–4 || 
|- align="center" bgcolor="#FFBBBB"
| 62 || February 23 || Montreal Canadiens || 4 – 1 || 22–29–7–4 || 
|- align="center" bgcolor="#CCFFCC"
| 63 || February 26 || @ New York Islanders || 6 – 3 || 23–29–7–4 || 
|- align="center" bgcolor="#FF6F6F"
| 64 || February 28 || @ Nashville Predators || 2 – 1 OT || 23–29–7–5 || 
|- align="center" bgcolor="#FFBBBB"
| 65 || February 29 || @ Atlanta Thrashers || 3 – 2 || 23–30–7–5 || 
|-

|- align="center" bgcolor="#FFBBBB"
| 66 || March 2 || Atlanta Thrashers || 4 – 3 || 23–31–7–5 || 
|- align="center" bgcolor="#FFBBBB"
| 67 || March 4 || @ Boston Bruins || 3 – 1 || 23–32–7–5 || 
|- align="center" bgcolor="#CCFFCC"
| 68 || March 5 || Washington Capitals || 3 – 2 || 24–32–7–5 || 
|- align="center" bgcolor="#FFBBBB"
| 69 || March 7 || Pittsburgh Penguins || 7 – 4 || 24–33–7–5 || 
|- align="center" bgcolor="#CCFFCC"
| 70 || March 9 || @ Atlanta Thrashers || 2 – 0 || 25–33–7–5 || 
|- align="center" bgcolor="#FFBBBB"
| 71 || March 12 || @ Tampa Bay Lightning || 5 – 2 || 25–34–7–5 || 
|- align="center" bgcolor="#FF6F6F"
| 72 || March 13 || @ Florida Panthers || 3 – 2 OT || 25–34–7–6 || 
|- align="center" bgcolor="#FFBBBB"
| 73 || March 15 || New Jersey Devils || 3 – 1 || 25–35–7–6 || 
|- align="center" bgcolor="#FF6F6F"
| 74 || March 18 || @ Washington Capitals || 4 – 3 OT || 25–35–7–7 || 
|- align="center" bgcolor="#FFBBBB"
| 75 || March 20 || @ Philadelphia Flyers || 3 – 0 || 25–36–7–7 || 
|- align="center" bgcolor="#FF6F6F"
| 76 || March 21 || @ Pittsburgh Penguins || 4 – 3 OT || 25–36–7–8 || 
|- align="center" bgcolor="#FFBBBB"
| 77 || March 23 || Pittsburgh Penguins || 5 – 2 || 25–37–7–8 || 
|- align="center" bgcolor="#FFBBBB"
| 78 || March 25 || Nashville Predators || 4 – 2 || 25–38–7–8 || 
|- align="center" bgcolor="#CCFFCC"
| 79 || March 27 || @ Philadelphia Flyers || 3 – 1 || 26–38–7–8 || 
|- align="center" bgcolor="#FFBBBB"
| 80 || March 30 || @ New Jersey Devils || 5 – 0 || 26–39–7–8 || 
|- align="center" bgcolor="#FFBBBB"
| 81 || March 31 || Buffalo Sabres || 4 – 3 || 26–40–7–8 || 
|-

|- align="center" bgcolor="#CCFFCC"
| 82 || April 3 || @ Washington Capitals || 3 – 2 OT || 27–40–7–8 || 
|-

|-
| Legend:

Player statistics

Scoring
 Position abbreviations: C = Center; D = Defense; G = Goaltender; LW = Left Wing; RW = Right Wing
  = Joined team via a transaction (e.g., trade, waivers, signing) during the season. Stats reflect time with the Rangers only.
  = Left team via a transaction (e.g., trade, waivers, release) during the season. Stats reflect time with the Rangers only.

Goaltending

Awards and records

Awards

Milestones

Transactions
The Rangers were involved in the following transactions from June 10, 2003, the day after the deciding game of the 2003 Stanley Cup Finals, through June 7, 2004, the day of the deciding game of the 2004 Stanley Cup Finals.

Trades

Players acquired

Players lost

Signings

Draft picks
New York's picks at the 2003 NHL Entry Draft in Nashville, Tennessee, at the Gaylord Entertainment Center.

Draft notes
 The New York Rangers' second-round pick went to the San Jose Sharks as the result of a June 21, 2003 trade that sent a 2003 second-round pick and a 2003 third-round pick to the Rangers in exchange for this pick.
 The San Jose Sharks' second-round pick went to the New York Rangers as a result of a June 21, 2003 trade that sent a 2003 second round pick to the Sharks in exchange for a 2003 third-round pick and this pick.
 The San Jose Sharks' third-round pick went to the New York Rangers as a result of a June 21, 2003 trade that sent a 2003 second round pick to the Sharks in exchange for a 2003 second-round pick and this pick.
 The New York Rangers' third-round pick went to the Philadelphia Flyers as the result of an August 20, 2001 trade that sent Eric Lindros to the Rangers in exchange for Kim Johnsson, Pavel Brendl, Jan Hlavac and this pick.
 The New York Rangers' fourth-round pick went to the Florida Panthers as the result of a March 18, 2002 trade that sent Pavel Bure and a 2002 second-round pick to the Rangers in exchange for Igor Ulanov, Filip Novak, a 2002 first round pick, a 2002 second round pick and this pick.
 The Edmonton Oilers' fourth-round pick went to the New York Rangers as a result of a June 30, 2002 trade that sent Mike Richter to the Oilers in exchange for this pick.
 The Calgary Flames' sixth-round pick went to the New York Rangers as a result of a January 22, 2003 trade that sent Mike Mottau to the Flames in exchange for a 2004 sixth-round pick and this pick.
 The San Jose Sharks' sixth-round pick (originally New York Rangers) went to the New York Rangers as a result of a June 22, 2003 trade that sent previous considerations to the Sharks in exchange for this pick.
 The Los Angeles Kings' sixth-round pick went to the New York Rangers as a result of a July 16, 2002 trade that sent Derek Armstrong to the Kings in exchange for this conditional pick.
 The New York Rangers' ninth-round pick went to the Pittsburgh Penguins as the result of a June 23, 2002 trade that sent Krysztof Oliwa to the Rangers in exchange for future considerations (this pick).

Notes

References

 
 

New York Rangers seasons
New York Rangers
New York Rangers
New York Rangers
New York Rangers
 in Manhattan
Madison Square Garden